Calling Philo Vance is a 1940 American mystery/comedy film released by Warner Bros. and starring James Stephenson as the dilettante detective Philo Vance, his only appearance as the character; Margot Stevenson co-stars. The film also features Henry O'Neill, Edward Brophy, Sheila Bromley and Ralph Forbes.  It was directed by William Clemens from a screenplay by Tom Reed, based on the 1933 novel The Kennel Murder Case by S.S. Van Dine, which had  been made into a film in 1933, starring William Powell and Mary Astor.

For this adaptation of the story, Vance is on international assignment from the United States government to investigate traffic in wartime aircraft designs. The original story dealt with art world double-dealing, but the solution to the mystery is the same in both films. Oddly, Sgt. Heath, Vance's usual police irritant, has been renamed Ryan.

Cast 
 James Stephenson as Philo Vance
 Margot Stevenson as Hilda Lake
 Henry O'Neill as J.P. Markham
 Edward Brophy as Ryan
 Sheila Bromley as Doris Delafield
 Ralph Forbes as Taylor McDonald
 Don Douglas as Philip Wrede
 Martin Kosleck as Gamble
 Jimmy Conlin as Dr. Doremus (misspelled in the credits as Conlon)
 Edward Raquello as Eduardo Grassi
 Creighton Hale as Du Bois
 Harry Strang as Markham's assistant
 Richard Kipling as Archer Coe
 Wedgwood Nowell as Brisbane Coe
 Bo Ling as Ling Toy
 Olaf Hytten as Charles (uncredited) 
 George Irving as Avery (uncredited) 
 Frank Mayo as Doorman (uncredited)

Cast notes: Warner Bros. intended to revitalize the Philo Vance series with British stage actor James Stephenson, but Stephenson never played the part again – he died of a heart attack in 1941. Actors George Reeves, known for playing Superman on television in the 1950s, and William Hopper, noted for playing Paul Drake on the Perry Mason in the 1950s and 1960s, both played small roles in the film. Vance's dog McTavish was played by Terry, who also played Toto in The Wizard of Oz.

Production
Calling Philo Vance had the working titles Philo Vance Comes Back and Philo Vance Returns.

References
Notes

External links 
  
 

1940 films
American black-and-white films
Warner Bros. films
American comedy mystery films
1940s comedy mystery films
Films directed by William Clemens
Films set in Vienna
1940 comedy films
1940s American films
Philo Vance films
1940s English-language films